Salina may refer to:

Places

United States
Salina, Arizona
Salina, Colorado
Salina, Iowa
Salina, Kansas
Salina, Michigan, a former village now part of Saginaw, Michigan
Salina, New York
Salina, Oklahoma
Salina, Pennsylvania
Salina, Utah

Other places
Saliña, Curaçao, a Dutch Caribbean residential area
Salina, alternate name for Larnaca, Cyprus
Salina, Sicily, an Italian island
Salina, Malta.

People

Surname
Anastasia Salina (born 1988), Russian volleyball player
Darío Salina (born 1995), Argentine football player
Daymaro Salina (born 1987), Portuguese handball player
Irena Salina (born 1978), French film director

Given name
Salina de la Renta, ring name of Natalia Guzmán Class (born 1997), Puerto Rican professional wrestler and valet
Salina Fisher (born 1993), New Zealand composer and violinist
Salina EsTitties, American drag queen
Salina Kosgei (born 1976), Kenyan long-distance runner
Salina Olsson (born 1978), Swedish football player
Salina Prakash, Indian actress

Other uses
Salina (springtail), a genus of family Paronellidae
Prince of Salina, a fictional character in the novel The Leopard by Giuseppe Tomasi di Lampedusa

See also
 Salt marsh
 Salt pan (geology)
Selina
Salinas (disambiguation)
Saline (disambiguation)